Guillaume Piketty (born 1965)  is a French historian. His specialty is the 20th century history of Europe, especially the Second World War and the French Resistance.   He received his doctorate  from Institut d'études politiques (Sciences Po Paris) in 1998 for his thesis "Itinéraire intellectuel et politique de Pierre Brossolette"    he has specialized in studies of the resister Pierre Brossolette and in the history of the Free French movement during the Second World War.

He was one of the two editors of Encyclopédie de la Seconde Guerre mondiale (2017)  , and one of the three editors of Dictionnaire de Gaulle (2006) ISBN

Books
 Piketty, Guillaume. Pierre Brossolette: un héros de la Résistance. Paris: O. Jacob, 1998. 
Piketty, Guillaume. La bataille des Ardennes: 16 décembre 1944-31 janvier 1945. Paris: Tallandier, 2015. 
 Piketty, Guillaume. Résister: les archives intimes des combattants de l'ombre. Paris: Textuel, 2011. 
Piketty, Guillaume, and Serge Berstein. Parcours résistants en France (1940-1945), entre histoire et mémoire. [S.l.]: [s.n.], 2002. OCLC 494250144
Piketty, Guillaume. Français en résistance: carnets de guerre, correspondance, journaux personnels. Paris: Robert Laffont, 2009.

References 

Living people
1965 births
Date of birth missing (living people)
Place of birth missing (living people)
20th-century French historians
21st-century French historians
French military historians
Historians of World War II